The Lancefield Football Netball Club, nicknamed the Tigers, is an Australian rules football club  located 61 km north of Melbourne in the town of Lancefield. It is affiliated with the Riddell District Football League.

Premierships
 
Riddell District Football League
1923, 1924, 1932, 1946, 1949, 1952, 1958, 1966, 1995, 1996, 2004, 2009,
 Assorted District competitions
1888, 1890, 1894, 1895, 1899, 1903, 1904, 1907, 1911

VFL/AFL players
Harvey Gibson - 
Alexander "Ike" Johnston - 
Silver Kane - 
Jack McCormack - 
Mark Bennetts -

References

Books
History of Football in the Bendigo District - John Stoward - 

Lancefield Football Club
1872 establishments in Australia
Australian rules football clubs established in 1872
Shire of Macedon Ranges